Alan Carlet (born 12 January 1977 in Grosseto) is an Italian former football player who last played for A.S.D. Vimercatese Oreno as a forward.

External links
 Player Profile at tuttocalciatori.net

1977 births
Living people
Italian footballers
Association football forwards
Cagliari Calcio players
F.C. Pro Vercelli 1892 players
Spezia Calcio players
L'Aquila Calcio 1927 players
S.S.D. Pro Sesto players
Novara F.C. players
U.S. Pistoiese 1921 players
A.C. Reggiana 1919 players
Pisa S.C. players
Botev Plovdiv players
Serie A players
Italian expatriates in Bulgaria
First Professional Football League (Bulgaria) players
Expatriate footballers in Bulgaria
Virtus Bergamo Alzano Seriate 1909 players
Association football midfielders